Gary Cantrell, known as Lazarus "Laz" Lake, is an endurance race designer and director. His races include the Barkley Marathons, Big's Backyard Ultra, Barkley Fall Classic, Vol State 500K, and Strolling Jim 40. In 2018, Lake covered the United States on foot, starting in Rhode Island and ending in Oregon.

A largely fringe figure known only within the world of ultrarunning, Cantrell gained worldwide recognition following a 2014 documentary called The Barkley Marathons: The Race That Eats Its Young.

His races are known to be especially grueling. Trail Runner magazine called him an "evil genius," "The Leonardo da Vinci of pain," "A master of sadomasochistic craft." Yet, his races have developed an almost cult-like following. The Bitter Southerner magazine described Cantrell as a "Bearded Saint" and "The Godfather of the Woods."

In 2020, during the COVID-19 pandemic, he organized the Great Virtual Race Across Tennessee (#GVRAT), which started on May 1 and ended four months later. During that period (123 days), the more than 19,000 participants - from all over the world - averaged over 5 miles per day to run (virtually from their hometown/country) a total of 635miles / 1021 km, and so crossing virtually the entire state of Tennessee.

He lives with his wife Sandra in Bell Buckle, Tennessee.

Races 
In 1979, Lake organized his first ultramarathon. He called it "The Strolling Jim 40," named after the first Tennessee Walking Horse to win best of his breed at the Tennessee Walking Horse National Celebration. The starting line was in Wartrace, Tennessee, where a headstone of the famous horse stands to this day. Cantrell conceived the race out of desperation. Ultramarathons were scarce in the late 1970s, and wanting to run one, he had to create it. “The course is mostly hills," said Cantrell, "and I believe for a runner to finish the race it will be less what’s in the legs and more of what’s in the mind." The 41.2-mile race is still held annually and is one of the oldest ultramarathons in the Southern United States.

In 1986, Lake created the Barkley Marathons, a trail race so difficult that it would become known as "the race that eats its young." The 100-mile competition added elements of orienteering and off trail scrambling. According to Lake, it is meant to test the limits of human endurance. Run annually in the spring, there have only been 17 finishers since its inception.

The Vol State ultramarathon was created in 2006 by Lake and involves runners covering the length of the state of Tennessee, a distance of 314 miles. Runners are divided into two categories, crewed or screwed. The latter being a self-sufficient trek without support. Separate records are kept accordingly, and runners have the option to choose what best suits their skillset. The first winner was Alabama native, DeWayne Satterfield.

In 2015, Lake organized the inaugural Race For The Ages. The concept was age-dependent, giving each runner a time limit equal that of their age. A 70-year-old runner would have 70 hours, 30-year-old, 30 hours. The runner with the most miles would be declared the winner.

Backyard Events 

Lake went on to invent a new format of race in 2011, the backyard ultra. Participants run a 4.167-mile loop every hour, on the hour and are eliminated if they fail to complete the loop in time. The distance of each loop is equal to 100 divided by 24, so that a competitor runs 100 miles for a full day of competition. The winner is the competitor who finishes one extra loop after all the other runners have dropped. The length of the event can range from 24 hours to four and a half days.

In 2020, Lake held the first Big Dog's Backyard Satellite Team Championship, where 25 countries competed against one another remotely from their respective homelands. Each team was allowed 15 runners and a team score would be the accumulation of the loops of each runner. By 2022, the number of countries participating had ballooned to 37 countries, which The New York Times called "an international battle royale," encompassing "qualifiers, hype videos and a livestream broadcast."

In 2022, two Belgian runners set the world record together by running 101 consecutive hours. Both runners decided not to continue and were thus unofficial finishers, though their record was honored. “This,” said Lake, “is the first time the runners defeated me.”

Backyard ultras are now held in over 40 countries across the globe.

In the Media 
Lake has been the subject of several documentaries, including the 2014 The Barkley Marathons: The Race That Eats Its Young and 2017's Where Dreams Go To Die. In 2021, Lake appeared on episode 27 of Real Sports with Bryant Gumble, where he was interviewed by Mary Carillo. When asked by Carillo if he was a sadist, Lake responded, "No. People enjoy it. There is just some discomfort involved."

Lake has been featured in Sports Illustrated, The New York Times, and The Guardian. He's been a columnist for Ultrarunning Magazine since its inception in May 1981.

References

Year of birth missing (living people)
Living people
People from Bell Buckle, Tennessee
Ultrarunning
Running
Trail running
Sportspeople from Tennessee